The Concours musical international de Montréal (CMIM) is an elite-level competition for classical musicians who are interested in pursuing an international career as a professional concert artist. Established in 2001 by the late André Bourbeau and by the late French-Canadian bass Joseph Rouleau, the CMIM features three disciplines - voice, violin and piano - on a rotating basis over a three-year cycle.

The CMIM is composed of four rounds: the preliminary round (based on video recordings), the First round, the semi-finals and the finals. Award winners receive prizes and grants valued at over $150,000. The 2023 edition, which will take place from April 22 to May 4, 2023, will be dedicated to the Violin, followed by the Piano edition in 2024 and the Voice edition in 2025.

André Bourbeau was the president of the Competition since its first edition in 2002 and was succeeded by François R. Roy in 2018.

Since May 2004, the CMIM has been a member of the World Federation of International Music Competitions. Christiane LeBlanc is the Executive & Artistic Director of the CMIM since 2012.

Editions

2022
The twenty-first edition of the CMIM was dedicated to voice and featured two divisions - aria and art song. First prize in Aria was won by Simone McIntosh. First prize in Art Song was won by Meredith Wohlgemuth.

Laureates

Special prizes

2021 
The twentieth edition of the CMIM was dedicated to piano. First prize was won by Jason Lee, from South Korea.

Laureates

Special prizes

2020
The COVID-19 confinement and closing of international borders prevented this nineteenth edition of the CMIM to be held. Instead, every day from May 4 to May 18, 2020, from their respective locations, the selected competitors performed short recitals, in anticipation of the competition, which was postponed to 2021.

2019
The eighteenth edition of the CMIM was dedicated to violin. First prize was won by Hao Zhou.

Laureates

Special prizes

2018
The seventeenth edition of the CMIM was dedicated to voice and featured two divisions - aria and art song. First prize in Aria was won by Mario Bahg. First prize in Art Song was won by John Brancy.

Laureates

Main Prizes - Art Song

Special prizes

2017
The sixteenth edition of the CMIM was dedicated to piano. The Grand prize was won by Zoltan Fejervari.

Laureates

Special prizes

2016
The fifteenth edition of the CMIM was dedicated to violin. The Grand Prize was won by Ayana Tsuji.

Laureates

Special prizes

2015
The fourteenth edition of the CMIM was dedicated to voice. The Grand Prize was won by Keonwoo Kim.

Laureates

Special prizes 
Radio-Canada People's Choice Award
Hera Hyesang Park (soprano), South Korea
André Bourbeau Award for the Best Canadian Artist 
France Bellemare (soprano), Canada
Joseph Rouleau Award for the Best Artist from Quebec
France Bellemare (soprano), Canada
Award for the best semi-final recital
Anaïs Constans (soprano), France

2014
The thirteenth edition of the CMIM was dedicated to piano. The Grand Prize was won by Jayson Gillham.

Laureates

Special prizes
Radio-Canada People's Choice Award
Jayson Gillham, Australia/United Kingdom
Award for the Best Performance of the Compulsory Canadian Work
Jayson Gillham, Australia/United Kingdom
André Bourbeau Award for the Best Canadian Artist 
Charles Richard Hamelin

2013
The twelfth edition of the CMIM was dedicated to violin. The Grand Prize was won by Marc Bouchkov.

Laureates

Special prizes
Radio-Canada People's Choice Award
Stephen Waarts, United States
Award for the Best Performance of the Compulsory Canadian Work
Luke Hsu, United States
Wilder & Davis Award for the best semi-final recital
Marc Bouchkov, Belgium

2012
The eleventh edition of the Montreal International Musical Competition was dedicated to voice. The Grand Prize was won by Philippe Sly.

Laureates

Special prizes
Radio-Canada People's Choice Award
Philippe Sly (bass baritone), Canada
Award for the Best Performance of the Compulsory Canadian Work
Philippe Sly (bass baritone), Canada
Award for the Best Canadian Artist 
Philippe Sly (bass baritone), Canada
Joseph Rouleau Award for the Best Artist from Quebec
Philippe Sly (bass baritone), Canada
Atma Classique Award for a CD Recording
Yuri Gorodetski (tenor), Belarus

2011
The tenth edition of the CMIM was dedicated to piano. The Grand Prize was won by Beatrice Rana.

Laureates

Special prizes
Radio-Canada People's Choice Award
Beatrice Rana, Italy
Award for the Best Performance of the Compulsory Canadian Work
Beatrice Rana, Italy
Award for the Best Canadian Artist 
Tina Chong, Canada
Joseph Rouleau Award for the Best Artist from Quebec
Steven Massicotte, Canada

2010
The ninth edition of the CMIM was dedicated to violin. The Grand Prize was won by Benjamin Beilman.

Laureates

Special prizes
Radio-Canada People's Choice Award
Benjamin Beilman, United States
Award for the Best Canadian Artist 
Nikki Chooi, Canada
Joseph Rouleau Award for the Best Artist from Quebec
Boson Mo, Canada
Award for the Best Performance of the Compulsory Canadian Work
Nikita Borisoglebsky (Baritone), Russia

2009
The eighth edition of the CMIM was dedicated to voice. The Grand Prize was won by Angela Meade.

Laureates

Special prizes
"Tribute to André Turp" (People's Choice Award)
Angela Meade (Soprano), United States
Award for the Best Canadian Artist
Yannick-Muriel Noah (Soprano), Canada
Joseph Rouleau Prize (Best Candidate from Quebec)
Charlotte Corwin(Soprano), Canada
Best performance of the Compulsory Canadian Work Award
Andrew Garland (Baritone), United States

2008
The seventh edition of the CMIM was dedicated to piano. The Grand Prize was won by Nareh Arghamanyan.

Laureates

Special prizes
Award for the Best Performance of the Compulsory Canadian Work
Nareh Arghamanyan, Armenia
People's Choice Award "Tribute to Yvonne Hubert"
Nareh Arghamanyan, Armenia
Joseph Rouleau Award for the Best Artist from Quebec
Marie-Hélène Trempe, Canada
Award for the Best Canadian Artist
Sergei Saratovsky, Canada

2007
The sixth edition of the CMIM was dedicated to voice. The Grand Prize was won by Marianne Fiset.

Laureates

Special prizes
"Tribute to Leopold Simoneau" (People's Choice Award)
Marianne Fiset (Soprano), Canada
Jean A. Chalmers Award (Best Canadian Candidate)
Marianne Fiset (Soprano), Canada
Poulenc French Song Award (Best French Song performance by a Candidate)
Marianne Fiset (Soprano), Canada
Joseph Rouleau Prize (Best Candidate from Quebec)
Marianne Fiset (Soprano), Canada
Best performance of the Compulsory Canadian Work Award
Susanne Ellen Kirchesch (Soprano), Germany

2006
The fifth edition of the CMIM was dedicated to violin. The Grand Prize was won by Jinjoo Cho.

Laureates

Special prizes
"Tribute to Gilles Lefebvre" (People's Choice Award)
Jinjoo Cho, South Korea
CBC Galaxie Rising Stars Award (Best Canadian Candidate)
Nikki Chooi, Canada
Joseph Rouleau Prize (Best Candidate from Quebec)
Jean-Sébastien Roy, Canada
Best Interpretation of the Compulsory Canadian Work Award
Ye-Eun Choi, South Korea

2005
The fourth edition of the CMIM was dedicated to voice. The Grand Prize was won by Sin Nyung Hwang.

Laureates

Special prizes
"Tribute to Richard Verreau" (People's Choice Award)
Lauren Skuce (Soprano), United States
Jean A. Chalmers Award (Best Canadian Candidate)
Peter McGillivray (Baritone), Canada
CBC Galaxie Rising Stars Award (Best opera performance by a Canadian)
Phillip Addis (Baritone), Canada
Joseph Rouleau Prize (Best Candidate from Quebec)
Phillip Addis (Baritone), Canada
Best Interpretation of the Compulsory Canadian Work Award
Elena Xanthoudakis (Soprano), Australia

2004
The third edition of the CMIM was dedicated to piano. The Grand Prize was won by Serhiy Salov.

Laureates

Special prizes
"Tribute to André Mathieu" (People's Choice Award)
Sergei Solov, Ukraine
CBC Galaxie Rising Stars Award (Best Canadian Candidate)
Darrett Zusko, Canada
Joseph Rouleau Prize (Best Candidate from Quebec)
Matthieu Fortin, Canada
Best Interpretation of the Unpublished Compulsory Work Award
David Fray, France

2003
The second edition of the CMIM was dedicated to violin. The First Prize was won by Yossif Ivanov.

Laureates

Special prizes
"Tribute to Arthur LeBlanc" (People's Choice Award)
Alexis Cardenas, Venezuela
CBC Galaxie Rising Stars Award (Best Canadian Candidate)
Sarah Pratt, Canada
Joseph Rouleau Prize (Best Candidate from Quebec)
Jean-Sébastien Roy, Canada
Best Interpretation of the Unpublished Compulsory Work Award
Diana Galvydyte, Lithuania

2002
The inaugural CMIM was dedicated to voice. The First Prize was won by Measha Brueggergosman.

Laureates

Special prizes
People's Award
Measha Brueggergosman (Soprano), Canada
Jean A. Chalmers Award (Best Canadian Candidate)
Measha Brueggergosman (Soprano), Canada
Joseph Rouleau Prize (Best Candidate from Quebec)
Joseph Kaiser (Baritone), Canada
Best Interpretation of the Unpublished Compulsory Work Award
Measha Brueggergosman (Soprano), Canada

References

External links
Concours musical international de Montréal
Jeunesses Musicales Canada

Violin competitions
Piano competitions
Singing competitions
Music competitions in Canada